Vestrup may refer to:

 Vestrup, Central Denmark Region, a village in Randers Municipality, Denmark
 Vestrup, North Denmark Region, a village in Vesthimmerland Municipality, Denmark